Pepsinogen 3, group I (pepsinogen A) is a protein that in humans is encoded by the PGA3 gene.

Function

This gene encodes a protein precursor of the digestive enzyme pepsin, a member of the peptidase A1 family of endopeptidases. The encoded precursor is secreted by gastric chief cells and undergoes autocatalytic cleavage in acidic conditions to form the active enzyme, which functions in the digestion of dietary proteins. This gene is found in a cluster of related genes on chromosome 11, each of which encodes one of multiple pepsinogens. Pepsinogen levels in serum may serve as a biomarker for atrophic gastritis and gastric cancer.

References

Further reading